Luis Walton Aburto (born 1 June 1949) is a Mexican politician affiliated with the Convergence. From 2012 to 2015, he acted as Municipal President of Acapulco. He previously served as Senator of the LX and LXI Legislatures of the Mexican Congress representing Guerrero. and as President of the Convergence between 2010 and 2011.

References

1949 births
Living people
Politicians from Guerrero
People from Acapulco
Members of the Senate of the Republic (Mexico)
Citizens' Movement (Mexico) politicians
Municipal presidents in Guerrero
21st-century Mexican politicians
Autonomous University of Guerrero alumni